Grégoire (born Grégoire Boissenot on 3 April 1979 in Senlis, France) is a French singer-songwriter and composer. He has released three albums to date and has had a number of successful singles in France, Belgium and Switzerland.

Career 
In December 2007 Gregoire signed a contract with the young label My Major Company, which gives subscribers the possibility of becoming music producers. Grégoire's first album was produced by 347 producers, forty of whom feature in the music video of his first single, "Toi + Moi". The song was subsequently played on NRJ and RTL radio stations and became a hit in Belgium and Switzerland and in the French digital chart.

In 2008 Grégoire was nominated at the NRJ Music Awards in the category 'French revelation of the year'. A second single, "Rue des Étoiles", was played on the radio in November 2008 and was released in December, then a third single, "Ta Main", the video for which was shot in March 2009 with the actress Inès Sastre. In September 2009 a fourth single, "Nuages", was broadcast.  The music video was broadcast on television but the song was only available digitally.

Personal life 
Grégoire had four brothers. As indicated in the music video, the song "Ta Main" was dedicated to Ludovic (1969–2002) and Nicolas (1974–2007), his two deceased brothers.
Grégoire has a degree in Applied Languages (LEA) English and German.

Philanthropy 
Grégoire has been a member of the Les Enfoirés charity ensemble since 2010.

Discography

Albums

Singles 

(Did not appear in Ultratop main chart, but in "bubbling under" Ultratip charts. Position in table reflects position in Ultratip plus 50 positions added)

Collaboration singles

References

External links 
 Official site at MyMajorCompany.com

1979 births
Living people
French pop singers
French singer-songwriters
People from Senlis
Warner Music France artists
21st-century French singers
21st-century French male singers
French male singer-songwriters